Jean Auguste Hérold, better known as Jean Hérold-Paquis (4 February 1912 – 11 October 1945) was a French journalist who fought for the Nationalists during the Spanish Civil War.

In 1940 he was appointed as Delegate for Propaganda in the Hautes-Alpes department by the Vichy authorities. From 1942, he broadcast daily news reports on Radio Paris, in which he regularly called for the "destruction" of the United Kingdom. His catch phrase was "England, like Carthage, shall be destroyed!". He was a member of the French Popular Party, better known as the PPF, one of the two main Fascist parties under the Occupation.

After the Liberation, he fled to Germany and then Switzerland. In 1945, he was handed over to the French, and subsequently executed for treason on 11 October 1945 at the Fort de Châtillon.

See also 
Hanoi Hannah
Lord Haw-Haw
Tokyo Rose
Axis Sally
Francis Stuart
Stuttgart traitor

References

1912 births
1945 deaths
People from Vosges (department)
French Popular Party politicians
Nazi collaborators shot at the Fort de Châtillon
Nazi propagandists
Nazi propaganda radio
French radio presenters
People executed by the Provisional Government of the French Republic
Executed people from Lorraine
Foreign volunteers in the Spanish Civil War
French people of the Spanish Civil War
French male non-fiction writers
Anti-English sentiment
20th-century French journalists
20th-century French male writers
Radio controversies